Guelph Airport  is located in the southeastern part of Guelph/Eramosa at its border with Guelph in  Ontario, Canada. It consists of two runways, 14/32 and 06/24. Although known to residents as the "Guelph Airport" or "Guelph Airpark", it is actually an aerodrome, being registered, and not certified, by Transport Canada.

The airport is classified as an airport of entry by Nav Canada and is staffed by the Canada Border Services Agency (CBSA) on a call-out basis from the Region of Waterloo International Airport on weekdays and the John C. Munro Hamilton International Airport on weekends. At this airport the CBSA handles general aviation aircraft only, with no more than 15 passengers.

Founded in 1954 by aviation enthusiast Len Ariss, the aerodrome remained in the Ariss family until August 2011 when it was sold to Inglis Berry.

Guelph Airpark in 2016
The airfield has one major tenant, the Tiger Boys Aircraft Works, and numerous private owners. Fern Villeneuve kept his aircraft there.

Guelph Airpark is a transfer point for the Government of Ontario's air ambulance service - Ornge. ORNGE helicopters land on the ramp near the terminal building and transfer patients to and from land ambulances. Antique aircraft often use the grass between runway 05/23 and the east–west taxiway for landings and takeoffs. Occasionally gliders on cross-country flights land at Guelph if they run out of lift.

Runway 14/32 has lighting. In 2016 Environment and Climate Change Canada reports some observations from this station.

In the spring of 2016 eight new hangars were under construction.

References

External links
 Page about this airport on COPA's Places to Fly airport directory
 Tiger Boys Aircraft Works - Restored antique aircraft

Tourist attractions in Guelph
Registered aerodromes in Ontario